Pleasant Peak is a location on the Falkland Islands, East Falkland,  north of RAF Mount Pleasant.

History 

The mountain was the site of the 1982 British Army Gazelle friendly fire incident when HMS Cardiff shot down a British Army Gazelle helicopter, killing its four occupants.

When the adjacent Mount Pleasant Complex was being constructed in the aftermath of the Falkland conflict, a quarry was opened up on the lower slopes of Pleasant Peak to supply hard rock (quartzite) for the construction of the foundations and a base for the runway.

References

Mountains of East Falkland
East Falkland